The France women's national football team has represented France at the FIFA Women's World Cup at four stagings of the tournament, in 2003, 2011, 2015, and 2019, the last of which they hosted.

FIFA Women's World Cup record

World Cup record

Record by opponent

2003 FIFA Women's World Cup

Group B

2011 FIFA Women's World Cup

Group A

Quarterfinals

Semifinals

Third place match

2015 FIFA Women's World Cup

Group A

Round of 16

Quarterfinals

2019 FIFA Women's World Cup

Group A

Round of 16

Quarterfinals

2023 FIFA Women's World Cup

Group F

Goalscorers

References

 
Countries at the FIFA Women's World Cup